Two ships of the United States Navy have been named USS Conflict:

  was launched on 18 April 1942 by the Commercial Iron Works, Portland, Oregon.
  was launched on 16 December 1952 by the Fulton Shipyard, Antioch, California.

References 
 

United States Navy ship names